"All of the Feelings" is a pop song recorded by Canadian musician Kiesza from her second studio album, Crave (2020).

Charts

References 

2020 songs
Kiesza songs